Romania competed at the 2015 World Aquatics Championships in Kazan, Russia from 24 July to 9 August 2015.

Diving

Romanian divers qualified for the individual spots and synchronized teams at the World Championships.

Men

Women

Mixed

Swimming

Romanian swimmers have achieved qualifying standards in the following events (up to a maximum of 2 swimmers in each event at the A-standard entry time, and 1 at the B-standard):

Men

References

External links
Federatiei Romane de Natatie si Pentatlon Modern

Nations at the 2015 World Aquatics Championships
2015 in Romanian sport
Romania at the World Aquatics Championships